Béla Las-Torres (20 April 1890, Budapest, Kingdom of Hungary – 12 October 1915, Castelnuovo di Cattaro, in the Kingdom of Dalmatia) was a Hungarian freestyle swimmer who competed at the 1908 Summer Olympics and 1912 Summer Olympics.

At the 1908 Olympics he won a silver medal as a member of a Hungarian 4x200 metre freestyle relay team. He also competed in the 400 metre freestyle event, reaching the semifinals. Four years later he was fifth in the 400 metre freestyle competition, did not finish in 1500 metre freestyle final, and was a member of Hungarian freestyle relay team that won the silver medal in the 4x200 metre freestyle relay event. He was killed in action during World War I.

See also
 List of Olympians killed in World War I
 World record progression 400 metres freestyle

Notes

References

External links
profile 

1890 births
1915 deaths
Swimmers from Budapest
Hungarian male swimmers
Olympic swimmers of Hungary
Swimmers at the 1908 Summer Olympics
Swimmers at the 1912 Summer Olympics
Olympic silver medalists for Hungary
World record setters in swimming
Hungarian male freestyle swimmers
Austro-Hungarian military personnel killed in World War I
Medalists at the 1908 Summer Olympics
Olympic silver medalists in swimming